The Nanjing Anti-African protests were mass demonstrations and riots against African students in Nanjing, China, which lasted from December 1988 to the following January.

Background

Animosity towards African students began in the 1960s, when scholarships provided by the Chinese government allowed many students from China-friendly African countries to study in Beijing. This policy was originally based on the idea of third world solidarity and Mao Zedong's linking of the fight against American and Soviet imperialism with Marxist class war. Many of these African students were given larger educational grants than native Chinese students, and hostility towards the Africans was a regular occurrence. Most of these students returned to their home countries before reaching the end of their courses due to poor living conditions and the political uncertainties of the Mao era. From the mid-1970s, China allowed African students to study outside of Beijing.

As well as resentment about the larger stipends given to African students, hostility from Chinese students towards Africans also flared up when there was contact between African men and Chinese women. In an incident in Shanghai in 1979, African students were attacked after reportedly playing loud music and making sexual remarks to Chinese women. These clashes became more common during the 1980s and sometimes led to arrests and deportations of African students. Cultural differences in dating habits added to the tensions.

Nanjing protests
On December 24, 1988, two male African students were entering their campus at Hohai University in Nanjing with two Chinese women. The occasion was a Christmas Eve party. A quarrel between one of the Africans and a Chinese security guard, who had suspected that the women the African students tried to bring into the campus were prostitutes and refused their entry, led to a brawl between the African and Chinese students on the campus which lasted till the morning, leaving 13 students injured.

300 Chinese students, spurred by false rumors that a Chinese man had been killed by the Africans, broke into and set about destroying the Africans' dormitories, shouting slogans. Part of the destruction involved setting fire to the Africans' dormitory and locking them in. The President of the university had to order the fire department to take action.

After the police had dispersed the Chinese students, many Africans fled to the railway station in order to gain safety at various African embassies in Beijing. The authorities prevented the Africans from boarding the trains so as to question those involved in the brawl. Soon their numbers increased to 140, as other African and non-African foreign students, fearing violence or simply by sympathy, arrived at the first-class waiting room at the station asking to be allowed to go to Beijing.

By this time, Chinese students from Hohai University had joined up with students from other Nanjing universities to make up a 3000-strong demonstration that called on government officials to prosecute the African students and reform the system which gave foreigners more rights than the Chinese. On the evening of  December 26, the marchers converged on the railway station while holding banners calling for human rights and political reform. Chinese police managed to isolate the non-Chinese students from the marchers and moved them by force to a military guest house in Yizheng outside Nanjing. The protests were declared illegal, and riot police were brought in from surrounding provinces to pacify the demonstrators, which took several more days.

The African students and their sympathisers were removed from Yizheng to another military guesthouse closer to Nanjing on New Year's Eve, and were returned to their universities the following day.

Aftermath
In January, three of the African students were deported for starting the brawl. The other students returned to Hohai University and were required to follow new regulations, including a night-time curfew, having to report to university authorities before leaving the campus, and having no more than one Chinese girlfriend whose visits would be limited to the lounge area. Guests were still required to be registered.

Anti-African demonstrations spread to other cities, including Shanghai and Beijing.

Tiananmen Square protests
The Nanjing protests were groundbreaking dissidence for China and  went from solely expressing concern about alleged improprieties by African men to increasingly calling for democracy or human rights.  They were paralleled by burgeoning demonstrations in other cities during the period between the Nanjing and the 1989 Tiananmen Square protests and massacre, with some elements of the original protests that started in Nanjing still evident in 1989 Tiananmen Square protests and massacre, such as banners proclaiming "Stop Taking Advantage of Chinese Women" even though the vast majority of African students had left the country by that point.

See also 
 Racism in China
Africans in Guangzhou
 Controversy over study buddies for international students in China

References

Further reading
China as a Third World State: Foreign Policy and Official National Identity,  Van Ness, Peter, Cornell University Press, 1993
Collective Identity, Symbolic Mobilization, and Student Protest in Nanjing, China, 1988-1989, Crane, George T
The Discourse of Race in Modern China, Dikötter, Frank, Stanford University Press, 1992
Racial Identities in China: Context and Meaning, Dikötter, Frank, 1994
An African Student in China,  Hevi, Emmanuel, Pall Mall, 1963
Anti-Black Racism in Post-Mao China, Sautman, Barry, 1994
Racial Nationalism or National Racism?, Sullivan, Michael J,  1994

1988 in China
1988 riots
1988 protests
1989 in China
1989 riots
Anti-black racism in Asia
Anti-immigration politics in China
Anti-national sentiment
History of Nanjing
Race riots in China
Racism in China
Riots and civil disorder in China
Student protests in China
1989 Tiananmen Square protests and massacre
Africa–China relations
December 1988 events in Asia
January 1989 events in Asia